San Francisco Rush 2049 is a racing video game developed and manufactured by Atari Games for arcades. It was ported to the Nintendo 64, Game Boy Color, and Dreamcast by Midway Games. The arcade machine was released in 1999; home versions followed in 2000 on September 7 for North America and November 17 for Europe. It is the third game in the Rush series and the sequel to San Francisco Rush: Extreme Racing and Rush 2: Extreme Racing USA. It is the last game in the Rush series to be set in the city of San Francisco and the last released on a Nintendo console. It also serves as the final game for the Atari Games label, which was retired shortly after the arcade release. The Dreamcast version was later rereleased as part of Midway Arcade Treasures 3 for the PlayStation 2, Xbox, and GameCube and later for Windows as part of Midway Arcade Treasures Deluxe Edition.

Gameplay
The game features an arcade-style physics engine. Tracks are based around a futuristic representation of San Francisco. Cars have the ability to extend wings from their sides, allowing for mid-air adjustments. This feature is a product of the science fiction setting and as such is not seen in other entries in the Rush series. As with previous titles in the franchise, Rush 2049 features a stunt mode in which the player scores points for complex mid-air maneuvers and successful landings. The game also includes a multiplayer deathmatch battle mode and race mode for up to four players. There are six race tracks, four stunt arenas, eight battle arenas, and one unlockable obstacle course named the Gauntlet. Various car types and upgrades are unlockable throughout the game, though cheat codes offer instant achievement of these elements. The single-player race mode encourages exploration of high-difficulty off-track shortcuts, creating a risk and reward structure to the gameplay. The game's soundtrack mostly comprises big beat, breakbeat and drum and bass.

Arcade game
The arcade version was an eight-player game (but more commonly bought in pairs), a sit-down machine with force feedback steering wheels, gear shifts, and three pedals (gas, brake, and clutch). A telephone-like keypad to the right of the steering wheel gave players the option of choosing a PIN and allowed them to earn points to unlock new cars and tracks. The machine used a 3dfx Voodoo 3 graphics card.

Arcade release history
The original San Francisco Rush 2049 was released in June 1999. This version features a roster of five playable tracks and eight different cars, with more unlocked as the player progresses through the game. In each stage, the player must race seven other CPU-controlled cars. The racetracks contain a total of 100 coins, which, when found, unlock new cars and paint jobs.

In 2000, Midway released an upgraded version, Tournament Edition, that fixed bugs and added two new tracks, four cars, and new shortcuts. It also had the ability to connect to an external server, via a T1 network connection, which allowed players to race against others in an online tournament. The upgrade was recalled soon after as Midway shut down its online tournament network, although it may still be found in a few sites that retained it, such as Video Bobs Starbase Arcade in San Rafael, which was heavily involved in play-testing as a result of their proximity to the Midway West campus.

In 2003, Betson Enterprises released an upgrade, called San Francisco Rush 2049 Special Edition, which brought back the tracks, cars, and shortcuts from Tournament Edition but removed online play due to Midway Tournament Network being shut down. This game was the final game released to carry the Atari Games moniker prior to the company being renamed Midway Games West later that year, with the Special Edition version release being the final Midway arcade game altogether, released two years after Midway shut down their arcade division and just before Midway Games West shut down that same year.

Soundtrack list
Rush 2049's soundtrack mostly comprises genres of big beat, breakbeat, drum and bass, and techno. All arcade songs were composed and produced by Mike Henry, while Barry Leitch composed and produced for the Nintendo 64 and Dreamcast versions, which have almost entirely unique soundtracks. The N64 version contains twelve music tracks, almost all of which are exclusive to that version and do not feature in the arcade versions. The Dreamcast version includes twenty music tracks, many of which are the same as the arcade versions and some of which are exclusive to that version. The arcade version includes eight music tracks, six of which are used during gameplay.

Ports
San Francisco Rush 2049 was ported to the Nintendo 64 and the Dreamcast in 2000 by Midway Games. The Nintendo 64 and Sega Dreamcast versions, as in the original arcade version, contain Dickies and Slim Jim advertisements. When released under licence as Midway Arcade Treasures 3, the Slim Jim advertisements were removed and replaced with Midway Games logos. All console ports featured a variation from the arcade version, that being the addition of stunt wings. The arcade version did not feature the stunt wing ability, which allowed players to perform maneuvers in the air whilst gliding.

San Francisco Rush 2049 was also ported to the Game Boy Color by Handheld Games and published by Midway Games. The tracks differ from the other versions whilst the cars are identical. The racing takes place from a top-down perspective.

Midway Games had plans to create a double pack for Hydro Thunder and San Francisco Rush 2049 under the name Hydro Rush for the Sony PlayStation 2, but the game was canceled when the project moved to Midway Arcade Treasures 3.

Reception

The Dreamcast and Nintendo 64 versions received "favorable" reviews according to the review aggregation website Metacritic. Jeff Lundrigan of NextGen gave the positive reviews for the former console version.

The Dreamcast version was a finalist for the Academy of Interactive Arts & Sciences' 2000 "Console Racing Game of the Year" award, which went to SSX.

Notes

References

External links

1999 video games
Arcade video games
Atari arcade games
Ed Logg games
Dreamcast games
Science fiction racing games
Game Boy Color games
Midway video games
Multiplayer and single-player video games
Nintendo 64 games
Racing video games
Racing video games set in the United States
Video game sequels
Video games developed in the United States
Video games set in the 2040s
Video games set in San Francisco